Twentieth Century is a 1934 American pre-Code screwball comedy film directed by Howard Hawks and starring John Barrymore and Carole Lombard. Much of the film is set on the 20th Century Limited train as it travels from Chicago to New York City. Ben Hecht and Charles MacArthur adapted their 1932 Broadway play of the same name – itself based on the unproduced play Napoleon of Broadway by Charles Bruce Millholland – with uncredited contributions from Gene Fowler and Preston Sturges.

Along with Frank Capra's It Happened One Night, also released in 1934 (which coincidentally has the same music over the opening titles), Twentieth Century is considered to be a prototype for the screwball comedy. "Howard Hawks' rapid-fire romantic comedy established the essential ingredients of the screwball – a dizzy dame, a charming, but befuddled, hero, dazzling dialogue, and a dash of slapstick." Its success propelled Lombard into the front ranks of film comediennes. The film was added to the National Film Registry of the Library of Congress in 2011.

Plot

Ebullient Broadway impresario Oscar Jaffe (John Barrymore) takes an unknown lingerie model named Mildred Plotka (Carole Lombard) and makes her the star of his latest play, despite the grave misgivings of everyone else, including his two long-suffering assistants, accountant Oliver Webb (Walter Connolly) and the consistently tipsy Owen O'Malley (Roscoe Karns). Through intensive training, Oscar transforms his protégée into the actress "Lily Garland", and both she and the play are resounding successes. On opening night, after her triumph, he comes to her dressing room to apologize abjectly for his behavior to her. As planned, she falls into his arms, begging him never to leave her, and they become lovers.

Cut to three years later. Their partnership has spawned three more smash hits, and Lily has been recognized as a transcendent talent. As a couple, they are famous—or infamous—for their spectacular battles.

Then Lily tries to break off their professional and personal relationship, fed up with Oscar's jealousy and control of every aspect of her life. Oscar talks her out of it, promising to be more trusting and less controlling in the future. Instead, he secretly hires a private detective agency run by McGonigle to watch her every move, even to the point of tapping her telephone. When she finds out, it is the last straw; she leaves for Hollywood and soon becomes a big movie star.

Without Lily, Oscar produces flop after flop. After one such disappointment, to avoid being imprisoned for his debts, he is forced to disguise himself to board the luxurious 20th Century Limited express train travelling from Chicago to New York City's Grand Central Terminal. By chance, Lily Garland boards the train at a later stop with her boyfriend George Smith (Ralph Forbes). After prevaricating, Oscar sees a chance to restore his fortunes and salvage his relationship with Lily.

Oscar schemes to get her to sign a contract with him. However, Lily wants nothing more to do with him. She is on her way to see Oscar's rival (and former employee), Max Jacobs (Charles Lane), to star in his play. However, Oscar manages to get George to break up with her. Knowing that Lily offers him one last chance at professional success he tells her of his wish for her to play Mary Magdalene in his new play; "sensual, heartless, but beautiful – running the gamut from the gutter, to glory – can you see her, Lily? – the little wanton ending up in tears at the foot of the cross. I'm going to have Judas strangle himself with her hair." Then Oliver thinks he has found somebody to finance Oscar's project, fellow passenger Mathew J. Clark (Etienne Girardot), not realizing that Clark is a harmless escapee from a mental asylum. When Oscar is slightly wounded in a scuffle with Clark, he pretends to be dying and gets a distraught Lily to sign his contract. The film ends with their first rehearsal, where Oscar reverts to his usual self, domineering a desperate Lily.

Cast
 John Barrymore as Oscar Jaffe
 Carole Lombard as Lily Garland formerly Mildred Plotka
 Walter Connolly as Oliver Webb
 Roscoe Karns as Owen O'Malley
 Ralph Forbes as George Smith
 Charles Lane as Max Jacobs (as Charles Levison)
 Etienne Girardot as Mathew J. Clark
 Dale Fuller as Sadie
 Edgar Kennedy as Oscar McGonigle
 Billie Seward as Anita

Production
The genesis of Twentieth Century was Napoleon of Broadway, a play by Charles Bruce Millholland about his experiences in working for the legendary and eccentric Broadway producer David Belasco.

His play was not produced, but it became the basis for the Hecht–MacArthur comedy, which lasted for 152 performances on Broadway, beginning on December 29, 1932, and which they later adapted for the big screen. Howard Hawks was not the first choice; Roy Del Ruth and Lewis Milestone had been set to direct before Hawks got the job. Columbia tried to get William Frawley from the Broadway cast, but instead borrowed Roscoe Karns from Paramount.

Before Lombard was cast, Columbia boss Harry Cohn negotiated with Eugenie Leontovich, who had played the part on Broadway, and then considered Gloria Swanson and Miriam Hopkins. Other reports say that Cohn also approached Ina Claire, Tallulah Bankhead, Ruth Chatterton, Constance Bennett, Ann Harding, Kay Francis and Joan Crawford. However, Hawks believed that Lombard was a brilliant actress who had yet to be unleashed on film. He convinced a reluctant Columbia to borrow her from Paramount Studios.

During Barrymore's initial reading with her, he looked to Hawks with an expression that showed he did not share Hawks's intuition. The rest of the production went dryly, with Lombard staggering through one scene after another and playing the same stoic characters that she had been taught to portray. Hawks took her aside and asked her what she was being paid for the film. Lombard told him and Hawks asked her what she would do if a man said "something" about her, coming up with an example from the back of his mind. Lombard said, "I would kick him in the balls." Hawks said, "Well, Barrymore said that, so why don't you kick him?" Of course Barrymore had said nothing of the sort, but the plan worked and after Lombard yelped a few profanities, she continued through the shoot with an unforgettable vigor. For the remainder of her career—until her tragic death in an airplane crash in 1942 at age 33—before beginning a film, Lombard would always send a telegram to Hawks saying, "I'm going to kick him!"

Lombard and Barrymore became friends during filming. When Barrymore's career was declining, Lombard raised hell to get him to work on her film True Confession (1937).

Preston Sturges was hired to write the screenplay around late November 1933, but was removed from the project a week later because he had not made sufficient progress.  Columbia then tried to get Herman Mankiewicz to write it, with Felix Young to produce.

Twentieth Century – a title which Columbia considered changing because they feared that many westerners would not be familiar with the name of the train – was in production February 22 – March 24, 1934.

During the filming, there were some problems with the censors at the Hays Office, who were concerned about the religious angle in the comedy of the film, and requested that it be toned down. Joseph Breen, who ran the Office, worried that "there will be serious difficulty in inducing an anti-Semitic public to accept a [motion picture] play produced by an industry believed to be Jewish in which the Passion Play is used for comedy purposes." The Office ultimately asked that one line be removed, which it was. They also requested that it be made less clear where Oscar jabs Lily with a pin.

Twentieth Century was premiered in New York at Radio City Music Hall on May 3, 1934, and went into general release on May 11.

Reception
In his The New York Times review of Twentieth Century, Mordaunt Hall wrote, "John Barrymore is in fine fettle in Twentieth Century" and "acts with such imagination and zest that he never fails to keep the picture thoroughly alive." All of the principal actors – Lombard ("gives an able portrayal"), Connolly ("excellent") and Karns ("adds bright flashes"), as well as Girardot ("an asset") – were also praised. However, Hall was less enthused about the comedy style, stating, "it seems a pity that they [Hecht and MacArthur] were tempted to stray occasionally too far from the realm of restrained comedy and indulge their fancy for boisterous humor."

Twentieth Centurys box office performance was described as "dismal". It was a box office disappointment.

Time magazine said "Twentieth Century is good fun, slick, wild and improbable."

Rotten Tomatoes  rates the film 86% fresh, based on 28 reviews.

In December 2011, Twentieth Century was deemed "culturally, historically, or aesthetically significant" by the United States Library of Congress and selected for preservation in the National Film Registry. In its induction, the Registry said that the "sophisticated farce about the tempestuous romance of an egocentric impresario and the star he creates did not fare well on its release, but has come to be recognized as one of the era's finest film comedies, one that gave John Barrymore his last great film role and Carole Lombard her first."

Adaptations

On the Twentieth Century
In 1978, Cy Coleman (music), Betty Comden and Adolph Green (book and lyrics) created the stage musical, On the Twentieth Century, based on the film, the original Hecht and MacArthur play and the unpublished play by Millholland. It ran on Broadway for 460 performances, and was revived for a special benefit performance in 2005. Its first full-scale Broadway revival began in February 2015, with Peter Gallagher and Kristin Chenoweth in the lead roles.

Radio
Twentieth Century was presented on Star Playhouse November 22, 1953. The adaptation starred Lilli Palmer and Rex Harrison, who were married in real life.

References

External links

 Twentieth Century essay by Michael Schlesinger [film essay for “Twentieth Century” - Library of Congress https://www.loc.gov/static/programs/national-film-preservation-board/documents/20th_century.pdf] at National Film Registry
 
 
 
 

1934 films
1934 romantic comedy films
1930s screwball comedy films
American black-and-white films
American films based on plays
American romantic comedy films
American screwball comedy films
Columbia Pictures films
1930s English-language films
Films about actors
Films about theatre
Films directed by Howard Hawks
Films scored by Louis Silvers
Films set in Chicago
Films set on trains
United States National Film Registry films
1930s American films